Jaime Alexandrino Gomes Pinto (born 28 September 1997 in Vila do Conde) is a Portuguese professional footballer who plays for Oliveirense as a forward.

Football career
On 24 January 2016, Pinto made his professional debut with Rio Ave in a 2015–16 Primeira Liga match against Sporting Braga.

References

External links

Stats and profile at LPFP 

1997 births
People from Vila do Conde
Sportspeople from Porto District
Living people
Portuguese footballers
Association football forwards
Rio Ave F.C. players
Merelinense F.C. players
S.C. Covilhã players
U.D. Oliveirense players
Primeira Liga players
Campeonato de Portugal (league) players
Liga Portugal 2 players